Jeremy Beck (born 1960) is an American composer who "knows the importance of embracing the past while also going his own way." The critic Mark Sebastian Jordan has said that "Beck was committed to tonality and a recognizable musical vernacular long before that became the hip bandwagon it is today. Indeed, [he is] ... an original voice celebrating music."

Early life and musical education
Jeremy Joseph Beck was born January 15, 1960, in Painesville, Ohio. His father, Albert William Beck (b. April 4, 1931, in Scranton, Pennsylvania; d. May 16, 2018 in Quincy, Illinois), known as "Al", was a visual artist and poet who taught for many years at Culver-Stockton College in Canton, Missouri. His mother, Mila Katrine Aho (b. June 24, 1935, Painesville, Ohio; d. March 26, 2018 in Memphis, Tennessee), known as "Katrine", was a pianist and organist who taught music privately. Beck's parents married in 1958, but not without some controversy: the Beck family was Jewish and the Aho family was Lutheran.  Albert's parents agreed to support the wedding as long as the Ahos knew they were Jewish. Katrine's parents agreed to support the wedding only if Katrine's father – Gustav Axel Aho, also known as "G.A. Aho", a Lutheran minister – performed the ceremony in his own church. Under those conditions, the nuptials took place.
The family lived briefly in and around Cleveland, Ohio, before moving to Kansas City for a year, 1967–68, where Al served as Dean of Students at the Kansas City Art Institute. The family then settled in Quincy, Illinois. Beck's parents were divorced in 1977.

Beck's earliest musical studies were with his mother; he then began playing the cello in the 4th grade in Quincy. While in high school, Beck studied music composition and theory privately with Thom Ritter George, an Eastman graduate and conductor of the Quincy Symphony Orchestra. Following his graduation from high school in 1978, Beck moved to New York City, earning a B.S. in Composition from the Mannes College of Music where he studied with David Loeb. He later earned a master's degree in composition from Duke University where he studied with Stephen Jaffe and Thomas Oboe Lee. Following his studies at Duke, Beck completed a second master's degree and a doctoral degree in composition at the Yale School of Music, studying with Jacob Druckman, Martin Bresnick, Lukas Foss, and Allen Forte.

Working life
After graduating from Yale, Beck taught music composition and theory at the University of Northern Iowa, earning tenured there in 1998. Beck took a leave of absence from UNI to teach for a year at Chatham College in Pittsburgh, Pennsylvania. However, instead of returning to Iowa, in 1999, Beck accepted a position as an associate professor of music composition and theory at California State University, Fullerton, where he also earned tenure, in 2002. During his teaching years, Beck was invited to teach and lecture on American music, music theory, and composition around the world, including in St. Petersburg, Russia, and Ghana.

In 2002, Beck accepted a short-term teaching position at the University of Louisville. Following a change in the administration and the loss of his position, Beck decided to pursue a J.D. degree, graduating from the university's Brandeis School of Law in 2007. In addition to his continuing work in composition, now Beck is also a practicing attorney in Louisville, Kentucky.  He blends his music background into his entertainment law practice, with an emphasis on copyright, trademark, and contracts.

Recordings

by moonlight
Beck has released six CDs of his music on the innova label.  About Beck's most recent release, the music critic Jonathan Woolf declared that Beck "...fashion[s] convincing music from traditional ways and means that sounds alive and relevant. ... [by moonlight] also shows his positive and tonal approach to composition, one that is happily devoid of arid technical or doctrinaire investigations." Another review declared that Beck's compositions are "Luminous, expressive, and refined [and that these] are some of the words that come to mind as the album's tonal pieces play, "by moonlight" deftly showing Beck cultivating an individual voice while operating within a tradition."

String Quartets
The critic Donald Rosenberg describes the music on Beck's CD, String Quartets (2013), as "forceful and expressive … concise in structure and generous in tonal language, savouring both the dramatic and the poetic," while Joshua Kosman of the San Francisco Chronicle states Beck's music is "appealing and skillfully crafted … [with] lush tonal harmonies." Kosman further observes that "novelty isn't the only thing music can provide, and the moody expressiveness of Beck's writing is its own reward."

IonSound Project
Beck's 2011 CD, IonSound Project, features the ensemble-in-residence at the University of Pittsburgh. His music on this recording has been described as "uplifting, buoyant and ... emotional and sensitive to both the performer and the listener." In addition, critic Andrew Sigler finds Beck's music "rhythmically intricate, and makes nods to the past while sitting squarely in the present. … Though architecturally rigorous, Beck writes clearly and without pretense[.]"

Never Final, Never Gone
Beck's third innova CD, Never Final, Never Gone (2008), features a variety of chamber and vocal music.

pause and feel and hark
His second CD, pause and feel and hark, released in May 2006, includes Black Water, a monodrama based on the novel by Joyce Carol Oates. Black Water received its Australian concert premiere at the 2012 Adelaide Fringe Festival. The stage premiere of this monodrama was produced by the Center for Contemporary Opera at Symphony Space on April 29, 2016 in New York City.

Wave
In 2004, Wave – a Slovak Radio Symphony Orchestra CD devoted to Beck's music – was released on the Innova label. This recording includes his four-movement Sinfonietta for string orchestra, "a harmonically inventive, thoroughly engaging work." The disc also includes his operatic soliloquy, Death of a Little Girl With Doves, for soprano and orchestra. This "deeply attractive" composition is based on the life and letters of the sculptor Camille Claudel. The recording of this major work was heralded for its "imperious melodic confidence, fluent emotional command and yielding tenderness."

Opera
Beck's short comic opera, Review, with a libretto by Patricia Marx, was one of three finalists in the 2010 National Opera Association's New Chamber Opera Competition. It was performed by Oberlin Opera Theater in February, 2014, and twice by Peabody Opera: in October, 2011 in Baltimore, and in Richmond, Virginia, at the College Music Society's annual convention. Review was previously included in the 2009 Opera America and Houston Grand Opera New Works Sampler. Following that successful showcase, Review was then produced by the Moores Opera Center at the University of Houston and later was given its New York premiere by the Center for Contemporary Opera.

Beck's opera The Biddle Boys and Mrs. Soffel was named by the Pittsburgh Post-Gazette as one of the Top Ten Cultural Events in Pittsburgh for the year 2001.

With a libretto by the composer based on a novel by Joyce Carol Oates, his monodrama Black Water received its stage premiere on April 29, 2016. Produced by the Center for Contemporary Opera, the sold-out production at Symphony Space's Thalia Theater in New York City featured Laura Bohn, soprano, and Isabella Dawis, piano, with music direction by Lidiya Yankovskaya and stage direction by Eugenia Arsenis.

Awards
Beck has earned awards, grants and honors from the American Composers Orchestra, California Arts Council, the Los Angeles Chapter of the American Composers Forum, Kentucky Arts Council, Millay Colony for the Arts, Wellesley Composers Conference, Oregon Bach Festival, and the Iowa Arts Council. In 2021, he was one of four first-place prize winners in The King's Singers New Music Prize competition.

References

External links

20th-century classical composers
21st-century classical composers
Living people
American male classical composers
American classical composers
American opera composers
Male opera composers
Mannes School of Music alumni
Duke University alumni
Place of birth missing (living people)
Yale School of Music alumni
University of Louisville School of Law alumni
1960 births
University of Northern Iowa faculty
California State University, Fullerton faculty
Chatham University faculty
University of Louisville faculty
Pupils of Lukas Foss
21st-century American composers
20th-century American composers
20th-century American male musicians
21st-century American male musicians